Civic Coalition may refer to:
Civic Coalition (Argentina), a political coalition from 2007 to 2011
Civic Coalition (Poland), an electoral alliance
Civic Coalition ARI, an Argentine political party